Upi Avianto is an Indonesian screenwriter and film director who has worked on several of Indonesia's most popular films in the 2000s.

She directed the 2004 film 30 Hari Mencari Cinta (30 Days Looking for Love) which founded the film career of actress Nirina Zubir. In 2007 she directed, wrote and produced the hit Coklat Stroberi.

Filmography

As screenwriter
 Tusuk Jelangkung (2003) (screenplay)
 Lovely Luna (2004)
 30 Hari Mencari Cinta (2004)
 Realita, Cinta dan Rock'n Roll (2006)
 Coklat Stroberi (2007)
 Shackled (2012)
 Sweet 20 (2017)

As director
 30 Hari Mencari Cinta (2004)
 Realita, Cinta dan Rock'n Roll (2006)
 Serigala Terakhir (2009)
 Ada Apa Dengan Monyet (2010)
 Mbah Marijan Ahli G Merapi (2011)
 Shackled (2012)
 My Stupid Boss (2016)
 My Stupid Boss 2 (2019)

As producer
 Coklat Stroberi (2007)
 Shackled (2012)

Awards and nominations

References

External links and sources 

Indonesian screenwriters
Indonesian film directors
Living people
1972 births